Robin Lapert (born 29 November 1997) is a French professional footballer who plays for Hartford Athletic in the USL Championship.

Career

Youth 
Lapert began his career spending three years with the Le Havre AC academy, where he spent a season with the club's under-19 side and two playing in the Championnat National 2 and Championnat National 3. Following his release by Le Havre in the summer of 2017, he signed with Arras FA, but opted to leave following the preseason to pursue the opportunity to play college soccer in the United States.

College 
In 2017, Lapert arrived at the University of Charleston, going on to make 21 appearances for the Golden Eagles, scoring five goals and adding a single assist on the way to help the team to win the National Championship. 2018 saw Lapert transfer to the University of Connecticut, who he made 40 appearances for, scoring four goals and tallying one assist in his three seasons with the Huskies.

Following college, Lapert was eligible in the 2021 MLS SuperDraft, but went undrafted.

Professional 
On 1 September 2022, Lapert signed with USL Championship club Hartford Athletic. He made his debut for Hartford on 17 September 2022, appearing as a 86th-minute substitute during a 3–0 win over Las Vegas Lights. On 26 November 2022, it was announced Lapert would remain with Hartford for their upcoming 2023 season.

References 

1997 births
Living people
Arras FA players
Association football defenders
Championnat National 2 players
Championnat National 3 players
Charleston Golden Eagles men's soccer players
Expatriate soccer players in the United States
Footballers from Le Havre
French expatriate footballers
French expatriate sportspeople in the United States
French footballers
Hartford Athletic players
Le Havre AC players
Sportspeople from Le Havre
UConn Huskies men's soccer players
USL Championship players